In the 1997–98 English football season, Aston Villa competed in the FA Premier League (known as the FA Carling Premiership for sponsorship reasons).

When Brian Little resigned as Aston Villa manager in February, Villa were 15th in the Premiership and were starting to look like outside bets for relegation. Ruud Gullit, recently sacked by Chelsea, was linked with the vacancy, but the surprise choice for the job was Wycombe manager John Gregory, a former Villa coach. He influenced a late run of form which saw Villa climb to seventh place, and for the second season running Villa qualified for the UEFA Cup via the UEFA Respect Fair Play ranking.

Final league table

Results
Aston Villa's score comes first

Legend

FA Premier League

FA Cup

League Cup

UEFA Cup

Players

First-team squad
Squad at end of season

Left club during season

Reserve squad
The following players made most of their appearances this season for the reserves, and did not appear for the first-team, or only appeared for the first-team in friendlies.

Youth squad
The following players spent most of the season playing for the youth team, and did not appear for the first team, but may have appeared for the reserve team.

Trainees
The following players were signed to Aston Villa as trainees, and did not appear for the youth or reserve teams this season.

Schoolboys
The following players were signed to Aston Villa as associated schoolboys, and did not appear for the youth or reserve teams this season.

Other players
The following players were signed to Aston Villa on unknown contractual terms, and did not appear for the youth or reserve teams this season.

Statistics

Starting 11

Transfers

In

Out

Transfers in:  £7,530,000
Transfers out:  £6,250,000
Total spending:  £1,280,000

Notes

References

External links
Aston Villa official website
avfchistory.co.uk 1997–98 season

Aston Villa F.C. seasons
Aston Villa